Mickey Charles Storey (born March 16, 1986) is an American former professional baseball pitcher and current manager of the Houston Astros' Triple-A affiliate, the Sugar Land Space Cowboys. He has pitched in Major League Baseball (MLB) for the Houston Astros and Toronto Blue Jays.

Career

Amateur career
Storey attended Deerfield Beach High School in Deerfield Beach, Florida, and Florida Atlantic University, where he played baseball for the Owls under head coach Kevin Cooney. In 2006 and 2007, he played collegiate summer baseball with the Bourne Braves of the Cape Cod Baseball League. He was drafted by the Minnesota Twins in the 22nd round of the 2007 MLB Draft but did not sign and was then drafted by the Oakland Athletics in the 31st round of the 2008 MLB Draft.

Oakland Athletics
Storey made his professional debut with the Arizona League Athletics in 2008, where he was 2–2 with a .327 ERA in 14 games. In 2009, he led all Oakland minor leaguers with 18 saves while playing across four different levels with the Class-A Kane County Cougars, Advanced-Class A Stockton Ports, Double-A Midland RockHounds and Triple-A Sacramento River Cats. In 41 combined games he was 1–1 with a 1.22 ERA. He also played with the Phoenix Desert Dogs of the Arizona Fall League after the season. He split 2010 between Midland and Sacramento and was 6–5 with a 3.64 ERA in 54 games, including his first professional start. He played for Bravos de Margarita in the Venezuelan Winter League at the conclusion of the minor league season. He pitched in 27 games for Midland at the start of the 2011 season and was 2–2 with a 4.03 ERA.

Houston Astros
The Athletics traded Storey to the Houston Astros in June 2011 in exchange for future considerations. The Astros assigned him to the Triple-A Oklahoma City RedHawks, where he was in 23 games with a 3.99 ERA. He played in the Dominican Winter League for Estrellas de Oriente after the season and returned to Oklahoma City the following year where he pitched in 38 games (making 2 starts) and was 7–4 with a 3.05 ERA.

Storey made his MLB debut on August 3, 2012, against the Atlanta Braves. He faced two batters spaced over the 7th and 8th innings and got a groundout and a popfly. On September 12, Storey was hit in the face by a line drive off the bat of the Chicago Cubs' Dave Sappelt and suffered contusions on his right hand and jaw, but only missed a few games.  He was in 26 games for the Astros and was 0–1 with a 3.86 ERA.

Toronto Blue Jays
Storey was claimed off waivers by the New York Yankees on November 20, 2012, then designated for assignment on November 30. He was re-claimed by the Astros on December 6, then designated for assignment again on December 17 when free agent Carlos Pena was signed and then claimed on December 19 by the Toronto Blue Jays. On December 21, the Blue Jays announced Storey had been assigned outright to their Triple-A affiliate Buffalo Bisons. He was brought up to the Blue Jays on May 9, 2013, and optioned back to the Bisons on May 20 when Anthony Gose was recalled. Storey was recalled by the Blue Jays on June 1, and optioned back to Buffalo on June 4. Storey was recalled on August 10 when Juan Pérez was placed on the disabled list. He was sent back to Buffalo on August 16. In three games for the Blue Jays he allowed three runs in four innings.

On March 10, 2014, he was optioned to the Buffalo Bisons. After a couple of stints on the disabled list, he was released on April 29 to make room for Chris Getz on Toronto's 40-man roster. He signed a minor league contract with the Blue Jays on May 23, and was assigned to the Bisons and placed on their disabled list. On August 19, Storey was released again by the Blue Jays organization.

Los Angeles Dodgers
Storey began 2015 with the Somerset Patriots of the Atlantic League of Professional Baseball but then on May 23, 2015, Storey signed with the Los Angeles Dodgers and was assigned to their Double-A affiliate, the Tulsa Drillers. In four starts he was 1–1 with a 3.47 ERA. The Dodgers released him on June 16, 2015.

Somerset Patriots
He became a free agent from the Somerset Patriots after the 2016 season.

Managerial career

Quad Cities River Bandits
In the 2018 season he was assigned as the manager of the Quad Cities River Bandits, a Class A affiliate of the Houston Astros.

Round Rock Express
On January 24, 2019 he was named Manager of the Round Rock Express, the Houston Astros Triple-A affiliate.

References

External links

Florida Atlantic Owls bio

1986 births
Living people
American expatriate baseball players in Canada
Florida Atlantic Owls baseball players
Arizona League Athletics players
Kane County Cougars players
Stockton Ports players
Midland RockHounds players
Sacramento River Cats players
Oklahoma City RedHawks players
Buffalo Bisons (minor league) players
Houston Astros players
Toronto Blue Jays players
Major League Baseball pitchers
People from Deerfield Beach, Florida
Phoenix Desert Dogs players
Bravos de Margarita players
American expatriate baseball players in Venezuela
Estrellas Orientales players
Leones del Escogido players
American expatriate baseball players in the Dominican Republic
Gulf Coast Blue Jays players
New Hampshire Fisher Cats players
Somerset Patriots players
Tulsa Drillers players
Bourne Braves players
Deerfield Beach High School alumni
Minor league baseball managers
Sportspeople from Broward County, Florida